Mini ATX or Mini-ATX is a generic name that may be used by motherboard manufacturers to describe a small motherboard, and has been used by AOpen in reference to a motherboard design with dimensions .  

Mini-ATX motherboards were designed with MoDT (Mobile on Desktop Technology) which adapt mobile CPUs for lower power requirements and less heat generation, which may be beneficial for home theater PCs (HTPC), in-car PCs, or industrial use.

Alternative definition 
The term miniATX was originally used in (now obsolete versions of) Intel's ATX specification, and denoted motherboards with dimensions of 284 x 208 mm (11.2 x 8.2 in.), before being abandoned in v2.1 in favor of the microATX specification. The two terms refer to different specifications and should not be conflated.

Features

Size

The smaller form factor Nano-ITX motherboard lacks a CPU socket module which limits its flexibility for different applications.

Noise
Due to a mobile CPU having lower power requirements, there is less heat generated by the CPU and internal components, and the thermal design is simplified. With its passive cooling design, it is typically noiseless and the manufacturing costs and overall operating power requirements are lower relative to active cooling designs.

Stability
Mini-ATX motherboards are a smaller form factor of the ATX motherboards, They typically use surface-mount technology for component placement, solid state capacitors to ensure stable power delivery and an 8-layer PCB design to increase durability and longevity. This design is aimed to provide a better overall performance and reliability compared to other form factors.

Flexibility
The DC-to-DC converter solution design removes the power supply unit from a Mini-ATX case. This reduces the system size and an external power supply unit brings more flexibility when deploying system.

References

External links
 PCtechguide on the ATX form factor: https://www.pctechguide.com/motherboards/atx-form-factor
 Other form factors information from C&T: http://www.codesandtutorials.com/hardware/computerfundamentals/motherboard-types-form_factor.php

Motherboard form factors